Vargulin, also called Cypridinid luciferin, Cypridina luciferin, or Vargula luciferin, is the luciferin found in the ostracod Cypridina hilgendorfii, also named Vargula hilgendorfii. These bottom dwelling ostracods emit a light stream into water when disturbed presumably to deter predation. Vargulin is also used by the midshipman fish, Porichthys.

History 
A partial extraction procedure was developed in 1935 which involved reacting the compound with benzoyl chloride to allow it to be separated from the water-soluble components. The compound was first isolated and purified to crystals by Osamu Shimomura. The structure of the compound was confirmed some years later. Feeding experiments suggest that the compound is synthesized in the animal from three amino-acids: tryptophan, isoleucine, and arginine.

Biochemistry 
Vargulin is oxidized by the Vargula luciferase, a 62 kDa enzyme, to produce blue light at 462 nm (max emission, detected with a 425 to 525 nm filter). 
The vargulin does not cross react with luciferases using coelenterazine or Firefly luciferin.

Uses 
Vargulin (with the associated luciferase) has applications in biotechnology:
 in a variety of assays, to report gene or gene expression after luciferase have been genetically introduced in cells,
 to detect ATP, that is used in the vargulin/luciferase reaction (cell viability assays)

Although less stable, the Cypridina system is useful because can be used in multiplex assays with other (red-emitting) luciferin assays.

References

External links

Luciferins
Bioluminescence
Indoles
Guanidines
Imidazopyrazines
Lactams
Laboratory techniques
Microbiology techniques
Toxicology tests